Amblin Entertainment, Inc., formerly named Amblin Productions and Steven Spielberg Productions, is an American film production company founded by director and producer Steven Spielberg, and film producers Kathleen Kennedy and Frank Marshall in 1980. Its headquarters are located in Bungalow 477 of the Universal Studios backlot in Universal City, California. It distributes all of the films from Amblin Partners under the Amblin Entertainment banner.

Overview
Amblin is named after Spielberg's first commercially released film, Amblin' (1968), a short independent film about a man and woman hitchhiking through the desert. Costing $15,000 to produce, it was shown for Universal Studios and won Spielberg more directing roles. 

The company was established a year later, in 1969, and it was properly incorporated in 1970. On July 14, 1975, Spielberg signed a four-picture agreement with Universal Pictures to produce its feature films through his Amblin label, aiming to build upon the success of its first two theatrical pictures The Sugarland Express and Jaws. Although Amblin is an independent production company, Universal distributes many Amblin productions, and Amblin operates out of a building on the Universal lot.

Amblin produced its first film Continental Divide in 1981, with Spielberg serving as executive producer. The following year, Spielberg and Marshall caught the attention of Metro-Goldwyn-Mayer (MGM), for which they both produced Poltergeist with Amblin, but under the name Steven Spielberg Productions. The same year, Spielberg and Kennedy produced E.T. the Extra-Terrestrial with Amblin (with Spielberg also directing it), which ended up being the highest-grossing film of the year.

In 1983, Spielberg produced Twilight Zone: The Movie with Amblin (with Marshall credited as an executive producer), but the company was uncredited. Amblin went on to produce a number of successful films throughout the 1980s, such as Gremlins, Innerspace, Batteries Not Included, Who Framed Roger Rabbit, and the Back to the Future trilogy. Gremlins was the first film to use the company's logo, which features the silhouette of Elliott flying in his bicycle with E.T. in the basket in front of the moon, from E.T. the Extra-Terrestrial.

In 1985, Spielberg and Don Bluth started a partnership to produce animated feature films. The only two films that were made from the Spielberg-Bluth deal were An American Tail (1986) and The Land Before Time (1988).

On November 5, 1986, Walt Disney Pictures and Amblin Entertainment teamed up to make Who Framed Roger Rabbit, its first collaboration of such after collaborations working with Universal Pictures and Warner Bros. Pictures, which had a pre-existing joint deal, which was directed by Robert Zemeckis, and it was slated for a G-rated feature, but it was upped to a PG-rated feature under the Touchstone Pictures label.

In 1987, Amblin Entertainment had named Brad Globe, former head of Lorimar's marketing division, as vice president of marketing at the production company, and Globe himself would be joined by two special consultants, which were Martin J. Lewy and Gerry Lewis, and will work closely with the marketing department of the companies that released Amblin's product.

In 1989, a dispute over film-making budgets caused Spielberg and Bluth to part ways, and Amblin's animation department was rebranded to Amblimation, which was headquartered in London. The only three films that were released under the Amblimation banner were An American Tail: Fievel Goes West (1991), We're Back: A Dinosaur's Story (1993) and Balto (1995). A fourth film, an animated film adaptation of Cats, was in development, but it was cancelled following the studio's closure in 1997.

The same year, Amblin signed a deal with Turner Network Television to produce TV movies.

In 1992, Amblin launched a visual effects studio Amblin Imaging, headed by visual effects pioneer John Gross. It was later shut down in 1995.

In 1991, founding partner Frank Marshall left the company after 10 years. The next year, Kathleen Kennedy left the company.

In 1989, they set up an animated unit Amblimation. It was defunct in 1997 and was transferred to DreamWorks Animation. In 1993, Walter Parkes and Laurie MacDonald joined  the company.

On June 21, 2021, it was announced that Amblin Entertainment signed a deal with Netflix to release multiple new feature films for the streaming service. Under the deal, Amblin is expected to produce at least two films a year for Netflix for an unspecified number of years. It is possible that Spielberg may even direct some of the projects.

Production company

Theme park attractions
While Amblin has never had its own theme park, theme parks have made rides based on Amblin films and co-productions.
 Back to the Future: The Ride, a simulator ride at Universal Studios Japan. The ride also existed at Universal Studios Florida and Universal Studios Hollywood.
 Gremlins Invasion, a ride at Warner Bros. Movie World and Warner Bros. Movie World Germany.
 Jurassic Park: The Ride, a water ride at Universal Studios Hollywood.
 Men in Black: Alien Attack, a dark ride at Universal Studios Florida.
 Roger Rabbit's Car Toon Spin, a dark ride in Mickey's Toontown, a land at Disneyland and Tokyo Disneyland.
 Twister...Ride it Out, a simulator ride at Universal Studios Florida.
 E.T. Adventure, a dark ride at Universal Studios Florida. Also existed at Universal Studios Hollywood and Universal Studios Japan.

References

 
Film production companies of the United States
Amblin Partners
Steven Spielberg
Entertainment companies based in California
Companies based in Los Angeles County, California
Universal City, California
American companies established in 1981
Entertainment companies established in 1981
Mass media companies established in 1981
1981 establishments in California
Privately held companies based in California
Cinema of Southern California